Madison Brengle was the defending champion but chose to compete at the 2021 Chicago Fall Tennis Classic instead.

Usue Maitane Arconada won the title, defeating Marcela Zacarías in the final, 6–1, 6–3.

Seeds

Draw

Finals

Top half

Bottom half

References

Main Draw

Berkeley Tennis Club Challenge - Singles